William C. Jones (October 19, 1822 – June 22, 1877) was an American politician from New York.

Life 
Jones was born on October 19, 1822, in New York City, the son of John Jones, a veteran of the War of 1812 and a close friend of Mayor Westervelt, and Sarah Tripp.

Jones attended the Chrestomatic Institute under Patrick S. Casserly. After finishing school, he worked as a store clerk for four years, followed by five years in the granite business. During this time, he moved to Brooklyn. With the help of George Taylor, he became employed by the Navy Department and worked as Superintendent of the Erection of Marine Barracks. He also worked as a boss stone-cutter for the Brooklyn Navy Yard.

In 1859, Jones was elected to the New York State Assembly as a Democrat, representing the Kings County 5th District. He served in the Assembly in 1860, 1868, and 1870.

During the American Civil War, Jones served in the South Atlantic Blockading Squadron on the staff of Fleet Engineer Robert Danby. After the War, he became a lessee of the Government docks in Brooklyn. He also held several positions under the city government.

In 1830, Jones married Susan J. Green. She died in around 1859. She was a member of the Methodist Episcopal Church and was an active member of the Freemasons.

Jones died at home on June 22, 1877.

References

External links 
 The Political Graveyard

1822 births
1877 deaths
Politicians from Manhattan
Military personnel from New York City
Politicians from Brooklyn
People of New York (state) in the American Civil War
Union Navy personnel
19th-century American politicians
Democratic Party members of the New York State Assembly
American Freemasons
Members of the Methodist Episcopal Church